Kingdonia uniflora is a species of perennial herb native to China. The plants have one leaf and a  flower stalk with a  flower.

It grows at high elevations in West and North China. Most of the plants are found in western Yunnan. It is an endangered species.

Classification 

Kingdonia is sometimes classified as the only genus in the family Kingdoniaceae or as a member of the family Circaeasteraceae along with Circaeaster agrestis, specifically in the APG III system of classification. Other sources may classify Kingdonia in the buttercup family, Ranunculaceae.  In any case it is in the order Ranunculales.

References

Ranunculales
Monotypic Ranunculales genera
Flora of China
Taxa named by Isaac Bayley Balfour
Taxa named by William Wright Smith